Yasin Salmani (born 27 February 2002) is an Iranian professional footballer who plays as an attacking midfielder for Persian Gulf Pro League club Sepahan.

Club career 
Salmani made his Persian Gulf Pro League debut on 19 December 2019 against Shahin Bushehr.

Career statistics

Club

Honours 

Iran U19
 CAFA Junior Championship 2019

References

2002 births
Living people
People from Gorgan
Iranian footballers
Association football midfielders
Sepahan S.C. footballers
Persian Gulf Pro League players
Iran youth international footballers
Asian Games competitors for Iran